This is a list of commercial banks in Ivory Coast

 Fully operational banks

 Afriland First Bank Ivory Coast
Bridge Bank Group - Côte d'Ivoire
Banque Atlantique Côte d'Ivoire (BACI)	
Banque Internationale pour le Commerce et l'Industrie de la Côte d'Ivoire (BICICI)	
Bank of Africa - Côte d'Ivoire	
Banque Régionale de Solidarité - Côte d'Ivoire	
Banque pour le Financement de l'Agriculture	
Societe Generale de Banques en Côte d'Ivoire
Export-Import Bank of Korea Côte d'Ivoire	
Standard Chartered Bank Côte d'Ivoire
 Stanbic Bank Côte d'Ivoire
COFIPA Investment Bank - Côte d'Ivoire	
Banque de l'Habitat de Côte d'Ivoire	
Société Ivoirienne de Banque	
Banque Nationale d'Investissement	
Compagnie Bancaire de l'Atlantique-Côte d'Ivoire	
Ecobank Côte d'Ivoire	
Omnifinance Bank - A member of Access Bank Group	
Versus Banque S.A.	
Banque Internationale pour l'Afrique Occidentale

 Representative offices only
 Bank finance funds ci

External links
 Website of Central Bank of West African States (English Version)

See also
 List of banks in Africa
 Central Bank of West African States
 Economy of Ivory Coast

References

 
Banks
Ivory Coast
Ivory Coast